Wallander is a Swedish television series adapted from Henning Mankell's Kurt Wallander novels, starring Krister Henriksson in the title role. The first season of thirteen films was produced in 2005 and 2006, with one taken directly from a novel and the remainder with new storylines suggested by Mankell. The second season of thirteen films was shown between 2009 and 2010. The stories are set in Ystad, Skåne near the southern tip of Sweden.

The three films Before the Frost (#1), Mastermind (#6), and The Secret (#13) were premiered in cinemas, with the rest first released as direct-to-DVD movies. The first episode of the second series, Hämnden (The Revenge), was released in Swedish cinemas in January 2009; the rest of the series was made for television. A third and final season, containing six 90 minute episodes, aired in 2013 with Charlotta Jonsson replacing the late Johanna Sällström as Linda Wallander. The first episode, adapted from the novel The Troubled Man, was released in cinemas in January 2013.

Season 1, 2005–06
From 2005 to 2006, the first 13 new stories, starring Krister Henriksson as Kurt Wallander, were produced. The first film is based on the Henning Mankell novel Before the Frost and was released in cinemas. The rest of the films are original stories based on plots written by Mankell, with scriptwriting completed by others. Two more were theatrical releases, and the rest were released on DVD and shown on TV.

S1 episodes

Season 2, 2009–10
In 2008, a further 13 films were commissioned. Filming began in August 2008, and continued during 2009. The 13 episodes were released during 2009 and 2010.

The first of these films, Hämnden (The Revenge), was a theatrical release on 9 January 2009, directed by award-winning Paris-based Franco-Swedish director Charlotte Brandström. The remaining 12 films went directly to DVD in Scandinavia during 2009 and 2010, and were broadcast there at a later date. In the beginning of 2010, both Canvas TV in Belgium and BBC Four in the UK began airing the 13 episodes weekly, which meant that they both showed the two last episodes before these had been released in Scandinavia.

S2 episodes
The episodes in the second series are:

After filming completed on the 2009 series, Henriksson stated that he would not play Wallander again, having only signed the new contract because he thought the 2005 series could have been better. However, he later indicated that he would be interested in playing the role in an adaptation of the final Wallander novel, The Troubled Man, because "it is the definite end".

Season 3, 2013

A third and final season, containing six 90-minute episodes, was released in 2013 with Charlotta Jonsson as Linda Wallander. The first episode, adapted from the novel The Troubled Man, was released in cinemas in January 2013, and the rest on DVD. The series finale premiered 30 July 2013.

S3 episodes

Cast
 Krister Henriksson as Kurt Wallander
 Johanna Sällström as Linda Wallander (series 1)
 Charlotta Jonsson as Linda Wallander (series 3)
 Douglas Johansson as Jan Martinsson
 Fredrik Gunnarsson as Johan Svartman
 Mats Bergman as Nyberg
 Ola Rapace as Stefan Lindman (series 1)
 Angela Kovács as Ann-Britt Höglund (series 1)
 Stina Ekblad as Karin Linder, the coroner
 Marianne Mörck as Ebba
 Göran Aronsson as Grönkvist
 Lena Endre as Katarina Ahlsell, prosecutor (series 2)
 Nina Zanjani as Isabelle Melin (series 2)
 Sverrir Gudnason as Pontus Höijer but introducing himself as 'Pontus Abs' in Kuriren (series 2)
 Gaston as Jussi (series 3)

Production
The following are some other personnel involved:
 Executive producers: Åsa Sjöberg, Jenny Gilbertsson, Peter Bose, Lars Björkman, Morten Fisker, Anni Faurbye Fernandez, Mikael Wallen, Niva Westlin, Vibeke Windeløv.
 Producers: Malte Forsell, Ole Søndberg, Lars Björkman, Lasse Bjørkmann.
 Editors: Håkan Karlsson, Tomas Beije, Mattias Morheden, Hélène Berlin, Margareta Lagerqvist, Kristofer Nordin, Dino Jonsäter, Gustav Öström.

Reception
To coincide with the BBC television adaptation, Wallander, BBC Four began broadcasting the 2005 series to United Kingdom audiences. Before the Frost and Mastermind were shown in November 2008; broadcast of the others began weekly in July 2009. Reviewing The Village Idiot and The Brothers in the Financial Times, John Lloyd wrote:

More evident is the philosophical underpinning that the books' author, Henning Mankell, brings, focusing down on the forensic work of a provincial detective the global sins of the western world. This coming week’s episode, The Brothers, is a murder mystery emerging from a terrible crime perpetrated by a group of drunken men on colonised people; last week's, The Village Idiot, had at its core the moral obloquy of a private surgeon greedy for profit.

Wallander and his comrades seek what remedies they can to the consequences of the sins of oppression and greed. At one point, Wallander tells his daughter, Linda, who is applying to become a detective, that she should reflect—otherwise she, like him, will emerge from a tunnel 30 years later, wondering what had happened to life. What had happened for Wallander is a melancholy immersion in human degradation, a provincial Inferno without a Virgil to guide him.

Writing in Örnsköldsviks Allehanda after the release of The Thief (2009), Peter Carlsson complained that only the first and last films of the successive series were any good, pointing out that these are the ones released to cinemas. Carlsson further criticised that the middle films "are often predictable, tentative and carelessly made", and that the arrest of the criminal is anticlimactic.

As a series, Wallander has been nominated for The International TV Dagger at the 2009 Crime Thriller Awards, an awards ceremony presented by British television channel ITV3 and the Crime Writers' Association.

Series 2 won the International TV Dagger at the 2010 Crime Thriller Awards, an awards ceremony presented by British television channel ITV3 and the Crime Writers' Association.

DVD releases
 The first season was released in installment sets.
 The first set of season 1 was released on a single Region 1 DVD by MHz Networks on 31 August 2010 under the title; Henning Mankell's Wallander: Episodes 1–3.
 The second set of season 1 was released on a single Region 1 DVD by MHz Networks on 21 September 2010 under the title; Henning Mankell's Wallander: Episodes 4–6.
 The third set of season 1 was released on a single Region 1 DVD by MHz Networks on 23 November 2010 under the title; Henning Mankell's Wallander: Episodes 7–9.
 The fourth & final set of season 1 was released on a single Region 1 DVD by MHz Networks on 23 November 2010 under the title; Henning Mankell's Wallander: Episodes 10–13.
 The 13 episodes of season 2 were released in a Region 1, seven DVD set by Music Box Films on 29 May 2012 under the title; Henning Mankell's Wallander (#MBFHE-034).
 The third season of 6 episodes were released in a Region 1, four DVD set by MHz Networks on 27 May 2014 under the title; Henning Mankell's Wallander 3.

References

Further reading
Macnab, Geoffrey (31 July 2009). "Wallander: Swede dreams are made of this". The Independent (Independent News & Media).
—A comparison between the Branagh's and Henriksson's Wallander

External links

Branagh's Wallander – Website relating to the BBC's English-language Wallander starring Kenneth Branagh and Swedish versions with Krister Henriksson and Rolf Lassgärd
Series 1 on Yellowbird.se
Series 2 on Yellowbird.se

2000s Swedish television series
2010s Swedish television series
2005 Swedish television series debuts
2013 Swedish television series endings
Swedish crime television series
Swedish thriller films
Detective television series
Wallander
Television series by Banijay
Television shows set in Sweden
Scania in fiction
Swedish-language television shows